This is a list of defunct airlines of Bolivia.

See also
 List of airlines of Bolivia
 List of airports in Bolivia

References

Bolivia
Airlines
Airlines, defunct
defunct airlines